The following is a list of decommissioned ships of the South African Navy.

Pennant numbers
South African Navy used the below pennant number prefix designations:
 A — auxiliaries
 C — cruisers
 D — destroyers
 F — frigates
 H — shore signal stations (military); survey vessels
 K — miscellaneous vessels
 L — amphibious warfare ships
 M — minesweepers
 N — minelayers
 P — patrol boats
 R — aircraft carriers
 S — submarines
 T — trawler (converted: WWII)
 Y — yard vessels

1944 change to pennant numbers
South African Navy vessels pennant numbers T01-T62 used numbers that were duplicated with the Royal Navy. In 1944 South African Navy vessel pennant numbers were changed to eliminate this duplication.  500 was added to pennant numbers T01-21, 440 was added to pennant numbers T22-39 and 400 was added to numbers T40-61. Thus as an example, T40 became T440 and T05 became T505. In the below tables, pennant numbers in parenthesis indicate the revised number applicable after 1944.

Battle Honours
The Battle Honours listed in the below tables makes use of an abbreviated form.  The full description for each category is below:
South Africa Waters 1939-1945: For operations within a radius of 1000 nautical miles of the South African coast, including South West Africa
Indian Ocean 1939-1945: For operations in the Indian Ocean, excluding an area within a radius of 1000 nautical miles of the South African coast.
Atlantic 1939-1945: For operations in the north Atlantic from the Equator to the Arctic Circle
North Sea 1939-1945: For operations in the North Sea and all waters to the eastward between Southend and the Shetland Islands.
English Channel 1939-1945: For operations in the English Channel and all waters of the south coast between Southend and Bristol, the western limit being a line drawn from Ushant to the Scilly Islands and thence to the north coast of Cornwall.
Libya 1940-1942: For operations in-shore between Port Said and Benghazi
Mediterranean 1940-1945:  For operations in the whole of the Mediterranean, the western limit being a line joining Cape Spartel and Cape Trafalgar.
Sicily 1943: For operations in support of the Allied invasion of Sicily.
Aegean 1943-1944: For operations in all waters of the Aegean Archipelago between 35 and 42 degrees north and 22-32 degrees east.
Italy 1943-1945: For operations in support of the Italian campaign.
South France 1944: For operations in support of the invasion of the South of France.
Pacific 1942-1945: For operations in the Pacific Ocean.

Pre-Union of South Africa
These vessels were operated by the four independent states before the formation of the Union of South Africa in 1910.

Mine laying and anti-mine vessels

Mine layers

Minesweeping whalers

Minesweeping trawlers

Minesweepers

Submarines

Anti-submarine

Anti-submarine whalers and trawlers
South African Navy vessels pennant numbers T01-T62 used numbers duplicated with the Royal Navy. In 1944 South African Navy vessel pennant numbers were increased to avoid duplication.  500 was added to pennant numbers T01-21, 440 was added to pennant numbers T22-39 and 400 was added to numbers T40-61. Thus as an example, T40 became T440 and T05 became T505.

Frigates

Destroyers

Corvettes
Ordered from France in 1976, but the sale was blocked in 1977 by United Nations Security Council Resolution 418 after official naming, but before they could be delivered or commissioned.

Fast attack craft

Strike craft

Defence vessels

Boom defence vessels
Boom defence vessels were used to maintain anti-submarine nets and anti-torpedo nets around ports, anchorages and individual ships.  Royal Navy Bar class.

Seaward defence boats

Harbour defence motor launches
HDML 1100-1200 Series were South African built harbour defence motor launches.  Length of 72 ft propelled by 2x Gardiner 8-cylinder diesel engines providing 130 BHP with cruising speed of 11 kn.

Depot / replenishment ships

Other vessels

Air-sea rescue launches

Hospital ships

Hydrographic survey

Training ships

Salvage vessels

Cable layer vessels

Examination vessels

Tugs

Notes and references

Notes

Citations

Bibliography

See also
List of ships of the South African Navy
Simonstown Agreement

External links
South African Naval Museum
History of the South African Navy

 

Ships of the South African Navy
Maritime history of South Africa
South Africa